Alexander Sergeyevich Osipov (born March 24, 1989) is a Russian professional ice hockey defenceman playing for Rubin Tyumen of the Supreme Hockey League (VHL).

Career 
In the 2014–15 season, after one game with Ak Bars Kazan, Osipov was traded for financial compensation to Dynamo Moscow on September 24, 2014.

On 17 July 2019, Osipov was mutually released from the remaining year on his contract with HC Spartak Moscow.

References

External links

1989 births
Living people
Admiral Vladivostok players
Ak Bars Kazan players
Atlant Moscow Oblast players
Amur Khabarovsk players
Avangard Omsk players
HC Dynamo Moscow players
HC Neftekhimik Nizhnekamsk players
People from Nizhny Tagil
Rubin Tyumen players
Russian ice hockey defencemen
SKA Saint Petersburg players
HC Spartak Moscow players
Sportspeople from Sverdlovsk Oblast